Kalabakan is a district in the Malaysian state of Sabah, located approximately  southeast of the state capital of Kota Kinabalu. It recorded a population of 48,195 people in the 2020 Malaysian census. Its capital is the town of Kalabakan.

Geography
Kalabakan borders the Sabahan districts of Nabawan to the west, Tongod to the north, Lahad Datu and Kunak to the northeast, and Tawau to the east. To the south, it borders Nunukan Regency in the Indonesian province of North Kalimantan.

The interior of Kalabakan features rugged terrain in the Kuamut Highlands to the west and the Tawau Highlands to the northeast, separated by the lower relief of the Kalabakan Valley in between. Several rivers including the Serudong,  and Brantian flow from the highlands into Cowie Bay, which is fringed with mangrove swamps. Human–wildlife conflict in the area includes the poaching of Borneo elephants and crocodile attacks.

Kalabakan has a tropical rainforest climate.

History
The place name Kalabakan is of Tidong origin, meaning "can eat". The indigenous inhabitants of the area are the Murut and Tidong people.

Chinese coolie labourers made up a majority of the mine's workforce, which numbered more than 3000 at its height and produced 1.5 million tons of coal over the mine's lifetime. The coal was transported by rail and barge to Sebatik Island, where it was loaded on ocean-going vessels for export.

During the Indonesia–Malaysia confrontation, Kalabakan was raided by Indonesian forces on 29 December 1963.

Kalabakan was administered as part of Tawau District until 1 January 2019, when it was established as an independent district. Prior to the split, Tawau District had been as large as the state of Negeri Sembilan. The Sabah government divided it into two districts with the aim of improving its administration and development. The current district officer is Rashid bin Abdul Harun.

Economy and infrastructure
Major economic activities in Kalabakan include farming of oil palm and local fruits, and shrimp fishing.

Paved roads connect Kalabakan with Tawau to the east and Sapulut and Keningau to the west. As well as the highway, plans were announced in 2020 to construct a new customs and immigration centre to better facilitate cross-border trade. Development of the border area, including the creation of the new district, is in part prompted by the planned relocation of Indonesia's capital to Nusantara.

Demographics 

Majority of Tidung, Murut and Lundayeh

References

External links
 

 
2019 establishments in Malaysia
States and territories established in 2019